L'école Estienne  is the traditional name of the  l'École supérieure des arts et industries graphiques (ESAIG) (Graduate School of Arts and Printing Industry). It is located at 18, Boulevard Auguste-Blanqui in the 13th arrondissement of Paris, not far from the Butte-aux-Cailles.

History
In 1887 the anthropologist and linguist Abel Hovelacque proposed that the city of Paris should create a municipal school of arts and professional printing for industry. In November 1889 the school opened with 108 students in temporary premises on rue Vauquelin.

The school was named in honour of the Estienne family, a famous family of 16th-century printers including Henri Estienne (elder), Robert Estienne and Charles Estienne. Its vocation was to address the poor qualifications and standards of printing and book-making, covering theoretical and practical aspects.

The main building was designed by architect Menjot Dammartin and built in 1896. The frame of the machine shop (1200 m2) was built by the Gustave Eiffel workshops in Levallois-Perret. The premises were inaugurated in  July 1896 by the President of France Félix Faure.

Notable alumni

 Cabu (1938–2015), cartoonist
 Robert Doisneau (1912–1994), photographer
 Pierre Gandon (1899–1990)
 Patrick Malrieu, industrialist
 Léo Quievreux (born 1971), comic book author and illustrator
 Siné (1928–2016), cartoonist
Xavier de Rosnay (1982), half of the duo Justice

References

General references
Three books on the History of the Ecole Estienne are available at the School library.
 Volume 1: 1889-1939 From the Belle Epoque to the Phony War.
 Volume 2: From 1939 to 1968 defeat at the shambles.
 Volume 3: 1969-2000 Footprints on the Moon to the bug of the Century.

Monograph of the Ecole Estienne. Municipal School of Professional Art and Paper Industries, Paris, Imprimerie School Estienne, 1900, 228 p.

External links
 Ecole Estienne - Official site

French printers
Art schools in France
Buildings and structures in the 13th arrondissement of Paris
Animation schools in France
1889 establishments in France